Jennings is an unincorporated community in Anne Arundel County, Maryland, United States.

References

Unincorporated communities in Anne Arundel County, Maryland
Unincorporated communities in Maryland